Stephen W. Thompson (March 20, 1894 – October 9, 1977) was an American aviator of World War I. Flying as a gunner on a French aircraft in February 1918,  he became the first member of the United States military to shoot down an enemy aircraft. Kiffin Rockwell achieved an earlier aerial victory as an American volunteer member of the French Lafayette Escadrille in 1916.

Early life

Thompson was born in West Plains, Missouri. When the United States entered World War I in April 1917, he was a senior in electrical engineering at the University of Missouri. The school announced that seniors who joined the military before graduation would receive their diplomas in June. So he enlisted in the Army and, after basic training at Fort Riley, Kansas, in June he was sent to Fort Monroe, Virginia for training in the Coast Artillery Corps. On the train coming into Norfolk he saw an airplane in the sky — the first he had ever seen.

When he got the opportunity, he went to the flying field, the Curtis School at Newport News, and asked if he could take a ride. Thomas Scott Baldwin, who had been a famous performer in his own balloons and dirigibles, was in charge and said yes. The plane was a Curtiss JN-4 Jenny and the pilot was Edward Stinson, a prominent flyer at the time who later founded the Stinson Aircraft Company. Stinson did a number of aerobatic maneuvers, including looping the loop five times in a row. Thompson said that the only thing that kept him from falling out of the plane at the top of the last loop was the lap belt. By the time he landed, he had decided to apply for duty in the Air Service.

World War I
He arrived in France in September and was assigned to the United States 1st Aero Squadron for training as an observer. The commander was Major Ralph Royce, who became a general in the Army Air Forces during World War II. The training took place from a field in Amanty. The French day bombardment squadron Br.123, which flew the Breguet 14 B2, was nearby at Neufchâteau aerodrome, and Royce was occasionally able to send one of his men along with the French on a raid.

First aerial victory
On February 5, 1918, the 1st Aero Squadron had not yet begun combat operations, and Thompson visited a French unit with a fellow member of the 1st Aero Squadron. Both were invited to fly as gunner-bombardiers with the French on a bombing raid over Saarbrücken, Germany. After they had dropped their bombs, the squadron was attacked by Albatros D.III fighters. Thompson shot down one of them. This was the first aerial victory by any member of the U.S. military.
 He was awarded the Croix de Guerre with Palm for the action.

In May, he was assigned to the new 12th Aero Squadron at Ourches-sur-Meuse airdrome, commanded by Capt. Lewis H. Brereton. On July 28, now flying from a farm field near La Ferté-sous-Jouarre, he was in another memorable battle. While doing artillery spotting during a battle near Château-Thierry, his Salmson 2 A2 was attacked by four Fokker D.VIIs from what had been Richthofen's Flying Circus but was by then under the command of Hermann Göring. Thompson shot down the first two planes that attacked him, but a bullet from the third hit his machine gun and disabled it. He was then hit in the leg, and his pilot was hit in the stomach by an exploding bullet. The pilot J. C. Miller managed to crash land the plane before he died of his wounds. Thompson dug the bullet out of his leg with a pocket knife. The pilot who shot them down near Villers Sur Fere was Sergy Frommerherz of Jagdstaffel 2 for his tenth victory; it was not famous German ace Erich Löwenhardt, who at the time was second only to Richthofen in victories. {Lowenhart had downed Esc. Spa.15, S/Lt. A. Cordonnier, MIA'.)

The uniform that Thompson was wearing when he shot down the Albatros D.III and the bullet he dug from his leg are on display at the National Museum of the United States Air Force.

Post-war life
After the war Thompson worked for several years as an engineer at McCook Field, the predecessor of today's Wright-Patterson Air Force Base. He then became a high school mathematics teacher. During World War II he taught preflight and meteorology. He maintained an interest in aviation and in 1940 he received U.S. Patent No. 2,210,642 for a tailless flying wing. He died in Dayton, Ohio at age 83.

See also
Kiffin Rockwell, American who shot down the first plane as a member of the Lafayette Escadrille
Frederick Libby, the first American flying ace

References

United States Army Air Service pilots of World War I
Aviators from Missouri
Burials at Woodland Cemetery and Arboretum
Recipients of the Croix de Guerre 1914–1918 (France)
1894 births
1977 deaths
People from West Plains, Missouri